Outpatients was an American hardcore/metal band formed in Westfield, Massachusetts, United States, in 1982 by brothers Vis Helland and Scott Helland with drummer Mike Kingsbury, and is considered to be among the first western mass hardcore bands to cross over to a thrash metal sound, and to tour outside the United States. Outpatients were known for their highly energetic live stage shows  while maintaining a tight musical performance. The group’s sound, imagery  and themes have been referenced and borrowed by numerous subsequent bands.

Western Mass years (1982–1988)
The group formed from the ashes of Vis’ first group, "Mace", formed in 1980. When Mace’s bassist left for the navy late 1982, he was quickly replaced by Vis' 14-year-old brother, Scott (who’d formed the hardcore group Deep Wound in 1982 with Lou Barlow and J Mascis), The band’s name was changed to “Outpatients’ and quickly made waves in the hardcore scene gaining rave reviews almost immediately. February 5, 1983, they released “The Basement Tape” which circulated in the underground worldwide, and made Maximumrocknroll's Top 20. Also this year was the first of many New york City shows at the legendary CBGB. They appeared on several Compilations including the now sought after “Bands That Could Be God” Compilation  This included tracks from their first studio recording which was done with legendary punk producer Lou Giordano and Jimmy Dufour at Radio Beat Studios in Boston.  Outpatients toured with Battalion of Saints in 1984 and appeared on the “Flipside Vol. 2” compilation.
Musically, lyrically and ideologically, Outpatients never fully committed to the
hardcore punk genre opting to allow themselves to progress musically. The band felt that hardcore was becoming too restrictive in general despite its non-conformist themes. Scott was amongst the first bassists in the area to incorporate slap bass into hardcore and metal and by 1985 the band’s sound had crossed over from hardcore to their own eclectic form of heavy metal.
In 1987 Mike Kingsbury left and was replaced by Scot Bates. In 1988 the band released “Free Association”  its first full-length album on vinyl.

NYC years (1989–1995)
In 1988 Scot Bates announced that he was leaving the group. That same summer NYC friends  School of Violence who were signed to Death Records, a sublabel of Metal Blade, had lost their bass player.  Vis and Scott relocated to New York City in the summer of 1988 and teamed up with the remaining SOV members  to complete the lineup. SOV broke up in 1990 and Outpatients reformed that same year. Mike Kingsbury moved to New York to play drums a second time but was replaced again by Scot Bates. In 1991 they released the demo “Life On The Outside” and hired 2nd guitarist, Marc Lichtenstein, and in 1992, toured in South America. Scot Bates left the group at the end of that year. Early 1993 the band released their “Test of Time” CD recorded at Don Fury Studios in Manhattan.  Subsequently, Mike Smith was hired on drums until the band's breakup in 1995.

Outpatients performed a single reunion show with Mike Smith on drums in New York City in 1996.

Discography

Albums
1983 Outpatients: Basement Tape, Free Association Records
1985 Outpatients: Committed, Free Association Records
1986 Outpatients: Second Thought, Free Association Records
1988 Outpatients: Free Association, Free Association/Incas Records
1989 Outpatients: Two Song Free Demo, Free Association Records
1990 Outpatients: Unreported Outbreaks, Free Association Records
1990 Outpatients: Committed Two, Free Association Records
1990 Outpatients: Battle of the Giants split 7-inch w/ Black Market Baby 
1991 Outpatients: Life on the Outside, Free Association Records
1993 Outpatients: Test of Time, Free Association Records
1995 Outpatients: Hardcore Outcasts Revisited 1982-1984, Free Association Records
1998 Outpatients: Outcasts II 1985-1995, Free Association Records
2001 Outpatients: Outpatients vs Dastupids split Lp, Rave Up Records (Italy)

Compilation albums
1983 Birth Defect Tape 
1984 Empty Skulls tape comp Skull Tapes
1984 Bands that could be God LP Homestead Records (includes Deep Wound)
1985 Flipside Volume 2 Vinyl fanzine Gasatanka Records
1998 Suburban Voice 15th Anniversary CD Suburban Voice Records
2002 Shielded by Death Vol.2 Western MA Punk`79-`83 CD Dionysus Records

Members
Original line-up:
Vis Helland - Guitar, Vocals
Scott Helland - Bass, B. Vox
Mike Kingsbury - Drums, B. Vox

Outpatients also included:
Scot Bates - Drums 1987-1988, 1990-1993
Marc Lichtenstein - Guitar 1990-1993
Mike Smith - Drums 1993-1995

References

External links
 The Official Outpatients Website
 Outpatients at Kill From the Heart
 Scott Helland official site
 Bands That Could Be God Comp at Kill From the Heart

Hardcore punk groups from Massachusetts
Musical groups established in 1982
Musical groups disestablished in 1995
1982 establishments in Massachusetts